Rehov is a moshav in northern Israel. Located four kilometres south of Beit She'an, it falls under the jurisdiction of Valley of Springs Regional Council.

History
The moshav was established in 1951 by immigrants from Kurdistan and Morocco on land that had belonged to the depopulated Palestinian village of Farwana. The name was taken from the ancient city of Tel Rehov, which was located in the area.

References

Moshavim
Populated places established in 1951
1951 establishments in Israel
Populated places in Northern District (Israel)
Kurdish-Jewish culture in Israel
Moroccan-Jewish culture in Israel